Adrien's Story is a 1980 Occitan language French drama film written, directed and produced by Jean-Pierre Denis. It was screened in the International Critics' Week section at the 1980 Cannes Film Festival where it won the Caméra d'Or.

Cast 
 Bernard Sautereau as The young Adrien 
 Serge Dominique as The adult Adrien 
 Marcelle Dessalles as The mother 
 Pierre Dienade as The father
 Jean-Paul Geneste as Roger 
 Marie-Claude Kergoat as The Shepherdess
 Christian Murat as The brother
 Odette Peytoureau as The grandmother
 Nadine Reynaud as Marguerite

References

External links 
 

1980 films
1980 drama films
Occitan-language films
French drama films
Films directed by Jean-Pierre Denis
Caméra d'Or winners
1980 directorial debut films
1980s French films